Events in the year 1886 in Argentina.

Incumbents
 President: Julio Argentino Roca (to 12 October); Miguel Ángel Juárez Celman (from 12 October)
 Vice President: Francisco Bernabé Madero (to 12 October); Carlos Pellegrini (from 12 October)

Governors
 Buenos Aires Province: Carlos Alfredo D'Amico 
 Cordoba: Gregorio Gavier then Ambrosio Olmos
 Mendoza Province: Rufino Ortega
 Santa Fe Province: Manuel María Zavalla then José Gálvez

Vice Governors
 Buenos Aires Province: Matías Cardoso

Events
3 April – President Julio Argentino Roca, with the support of the agricultural elites – as well as of the London financial powerhouse, Barings Bank – fields his son-in-law, Córdoba Province Governor Miguel Juárez Celman, as the PAN candidate for president; he is elected almost unanimously.

Births
23 February – Antonio Alice, painter (died 1943)
6 June – Salvador Mazza, epidemiologist (died 1946)
20 December – Celestino Piaggio, pianist, conductor and composer (died 1931)

Deaths
1 February – Juan Esteban Pedernera, acting president in 1861 (born 1796)
21 October – José Hernández, journalist, poet, and politician (born 1834; heart disease)

References

 
History of Argentina (1880–1916)
Years of the 19th century in Argentina